Dan Fraga (born June 19, 1973) is a comic book artist, storyboard artist, concept artist, and animation and film director originally from Martinez, California. He also hosts a Youtube show called, "Couchdoodles Show". Immediately after high school, he was hired to work as an illustrator for Rob Liefeld’s Extreme Studios; one of the founding partner studios that made up Image Comics. Dan was one of the youngest creators to be a part of the beginnings of Image Comics. He worked in the comic book industry for many years and worked on titles such as Spider-Man, Bloodstrike, Black Flag, Kid Supreme, Superman, Black Panther, Witchblade, and Wolverine.

He has also worked in film and animation, most famously as the director of the Ricky Gervais Show. He also worked as an animation director for Mattel and Monster High. His storyboard credits include movies such as Fantastic Four: Rise of the Silver Surfer and Transporter 2.

Career

Dan Fraga began his career in the entertainment field as a comic book artist. He has worked on many comics like Spider-Man, Wolverine and  Bloodstrike. He has also worked as a storyboard artist. Some of his career highlights include working on storyboards for Hershey's, Victoria's Secret, and music videos for top artist Justin Timberlake and also Beyoncé. During his time as a storyboard artist, Dan took on several other responsibilities including set design, visual effects supervision, and 2nd unit directing.

Comic books

Black Flag is a fictional superhero team and comic book series originally written and illustrated by Dan Fraga. It was published by Maximum Press and one preview edition by Image Comics in 1995. The comic features an organized para-military-styled team of characters composed of a former military Landstorm pilot, a master of mysticism, a billionaire heiress, an eight-foot-talking purple gorilla, a dimension-hopping shapeshifting alien revolutionary, and a boy who can make fantasy a reality with the snap of his fingers.

In April 2020, Fraga brought back the Black Flag IP with the graphic novel Black Flag: Pineapple Perception. The art and style are reminiscent of the original comic, but with modern updates. It is intended to be the first in a four-part series. The creative team includes Fraga, Will Perdomo (story), Shelby Robertson (inks), and Matt Yackey (colors). The first novel was crowdfunded on Indiegogo, and has raised over $200,000 by February 2021.

Web comic 
In January 2013, Fraga launched a webcomic called The Grave, publishing a panel every day for a year. The Grave follows a group of children on a camping trip, who find a mysterious grave with a fully clothed skeleton inside. The children deduce facts about the buried man using clues from the grave.

Television 
Fraga made his directing debut in 2009 on the MTV show The Hard Times of RJ Berger handling the animation duties for the show. There were two seasons about a 15-year-old unpopular RJ Berger who becomes infamous after an embarrassing incident. Each episode featured live-action intermixed with different styles of animation.

He directed the second and third seasons of the HBO series The Ricky Gervais Show (animated series) which were voiced by Ricky Gervais, Stephen Merchant and Karl Pilkington. The series was an animated version of The Ricky Gervais Show using audio from previously recorded live radio shows, podcasts, and audiobooks.

In 2018, Dan moved to Atlanta to work as the storyboard artist on the CW's Legacies and DC's Doom Patrol.

References

Other sources

External links
Website of Dan Fraga

Dan Fraga on Facebook
Dan Fraga on Instagram

The Comicbook Database: Dan Fraga
 The Ricky Gervais Show Season 2 acting reel from Dan Fraga

People from Walnut Creek, California
Living people
1973 births
American people of Azorean descent
American storyboard artists